Moses Rawlings (1740–1809) served in the Continental Army during the American Revolutionary War, most notably at the Battle of Fort Washington. He attained the rank of lieutenant colonel before leaving the military in 1779. He later served as the State Commissioner for Prisoners in Maryland.

American Revolutionary War
Rawlings was appointed as first lieutenant in Capt. Michael Cresap's Independent Rifle Company from Frederick County, Maryland. Shortly afterward Cresap died, and Rawlings replaced him as company commander. On June 17, 1776, the company was joined to the newly formed Maryland and Virginia Rifle Regiment  and Rawlings was named second-in-command and promoted to the rank of lieutenant colonel. When the regimental commander, Col. Hugh Stephenson, died in August 1776, Rawlings took command of the regiment. The unit consisted of approximately 250 riflemen, and was often referred to as "Rawlings' Regiment".

During the Battle of Fort Washington, the Maryland and Virginia Rifle Regiment was positioned about a half mile north of Fort Washington on Manhattan Island. From November 2 to November 14, 1776, they defended against German Hessian mercenaries, but on November 16 they were finally pushed back to Fort Washington, which surrendered a short time after. Rawlings was taken prisoner, but escaped. General Washington had also requested that Rawlings be released as part of a prisoner exchange.

Throughout the remainder of his military career, Rawlings often wrote to Washington concerning pay for his soldiers and recruits, as he had difficulty paying his soldiers. Washington's response often included requests that Rawlings use his own money to pay his soldiers until more money could be obtained from Congress.

At the conclusion of the war, Rawlings was admitted as an original member of The Society of the Cincinnati of Maryland.

Post-War
Rawlings was a delegate to the Maryland State Convention of 1788, to vote whether Maryland should ratify the proposed Constitution of the United States.

In 1779, Rawlings became the State Commissioner of Prisoners out of Frederick Town, Maryland.

Family
Rawlings was married to Elizabeth McMahon. He also had a son named Moses Rawlings.

Notes

References
Dandridge, Danske (1911). American Prisoners of the Revolution, Charlottesville: The Michie Company, Printers.
Heitman, Francis B. (1914). Historical register of officers of the Continental Army during the War of the Revolution, April, 1775, to December, 1783. Washington, D.C.: The Rare Book Shop Publishing Co., pp. 459
Pedan, Henry C. (2006). Revolutionary Patriots of Anne Arundel County, Maryland, Heritage Books.
Southern Campaign American Revolution Pension Statements
George Washington to Joshua Loring (January 14, 1777) Library of Congress, George Washington Papers, Series 3e.
George Washington to Moses Rawlings (March 7, 1779) Library of Congress, George Washington Papers, Series 3b.
George Washington to William Palfrey (October 17, 1779) Library of Congress, George Washington Papers, Series 3b.
George Washington to Moses Rawlings (December 12, 1781) Library of Congress, George Washington Papers, Series 4.
Metcalf, Bryce (1938). Original Members and Other Officers Eligible to the Society of the Cincinnati, 1783-1938: With the Institution, Rules of Admission, and Lists of the Officers of the General and State Societies Strasburg, VA: Shenandoah Publishing House, Inc.

External links
 The Society of the Cincinnati
 The American Revolution Institute

1740 births
1809 deaths
American Revolutionary War prisoners of war held by Great Britain
Continental Army officers from Maryland